Dralfa is a village in Northern Bulgaria. The village is located in Targovishte Municipality, Targovishte Province. Аccording to the numbers provided by the 2020 Bulgarian census, Dralfa currently has a population of 587 people with a permanent address registered in the settlement.

Geography 
The village lies between two geographical areas - the Balkan Mountains and the Danubian Plain (Bulgaria).

Dralfa village is located in Municipality Targovishte, 17 kilometers northwest away from Targovishte. The village is a railway station for the busiest railway line in Bulgaria, Sofia - Varna.

Dralfa's continental climate offers good conditions for animal husbandry, pig and sheep breeding.

A very large area of the village's land is used for the production of crops like wheat and corn.

The village's elevation ranges between 200 and 299 meters with an average elevation of 212 meters above sea level.

Infrastructure 
There is an active bakery in the village, supplying the nearby 10 villages with bread. A Thracian historical mound was found near the village, which was a burial site dating back to the 4th century.

Buildings 

 There is a local community center and library “Napredak”. It was built in 1903. It is still active.
 The elementary school “Sv. sv. Kiril i Metodii” is active in the village and was built in 1891. Rebuilt in 1970.

Ethnicity 
According to the Bulgarian population census in 2011.

References 

Villages in Targovishte Province